Jeremy's Back is a mountain ridge in New London County, Connecticut.  It is named after Jeremy Adams, one of the original founders of Hartford, CT.

It is located near the Jeremy River (also named after Jeremy Adams), a favorite paddling destination in the area.

References

External links
 Connecticut Explorer's Guide Online paddling maps of the Jeremy River

Landforms of New London County, Connecticut
Mountains of Connecticut